Okruzhnaya may refer to:

 Okruzhnaya (Lyublinsko-Dmitrovskaya line)
 Okruzhnaya (Moscow Central Circle)
 Okruzhnaya railway station